The 2010 Safeway Championship (Manitoba men's provincial curling championship) was held February 10–14, 2010 at the T.G. Smith Centre in Steinbach, Manitoba. The winner went on to represent Manitoba at the 2010 Tim Hortons Brier in Halifax, Nova Scotia.

Teams

Draw Brackets
32 team double knockout with playoff round
Four teams qualify each from A Event and B Event

A Event

B Event

Results

All times CST

Draw 1
February 10, 8:30am

Draw 2
February 10, 12:15pm

Draw 3
February 10, 4:00pm

Draw 4
February 10, 8:15pm

Draw 5
February 11, 8:30am

Draw 6
February 11, 12:15pm

Draw 7
February 11, 4:00pm

Draw 8
February 11, 7:45pm

Draw 9
February 12, 8:30am

Draw 10
February 12, 12:15pm

Draw 11
February 12, 4:00pm

Playoffs

Playoff round
8 team double knockout
Four teams qualify into Championship round

First round
February 12, 7:45pm

Second round
February 13, 9:00am

Third round
February 13, 2:00pm

Championship Round

1 vs. 2
February 13, 7:00pm

3 vs. 4
February 13, 7:00pm

Semifinal
February 14, 9:30am

Final
February 14, 2:00pm

Awards
All-Star Team
 Skip - Jeff Stoughton, Team Stoughton
 Third - B.J. Neufeld, Team McEwen
 Second - Matt Wozniak, Team McEwen
 Lead - Denni Neufeld, Team McEwen

References

External links
Manitoba Curling Association
Official site

Safeway Championship
Safeway Select, 2010
2010 in Manitoba
Curling in Manitoba
February 2010 sports events in Canada